Nadzaladevi is an administrative district (raioni) in Tbilisi, capital of Georgia.

Nadzaladevi District Includes Neighborhoods: Nadzaladevi, Sanzona, Temka, Lotkini.

References 

Districts of Tbilisi